Eske Schlüters (born 1970) Leer, East Frisia) is a German video artist.

She graduated from Hochschule für bildende Künste Hamburg in 2004.
She lives and works in Hamburg.

Awards
2009 Villa Romana prize.

Solo exhibitions
2008 "Ähnliches und Mögliches — levels of enactment", Kunstverein für die Rheinlande und Westfalen, Düsseldorf
2007 "Mismatch", Pudelkollektion, Pudel Club Hamburg
2006 "Sehen als Denken sehen", Museum für Gegenwartskunst, Siegen; Viper, Basel
2003 "True to You", Gold, Hamburg

References

German video artists
1970 births
Living people